Wycarbah is a rural locality in the Rockhampton Region, Queensland, Australia.

History 
Rosewood Crossing Provisional School opened on 31 July 1876. In 1892 it was renamed Wycarbah Provisional School. On 1 January 1909 it became Wycarbah State School. It closed circa 1935.

References 

Suburbs of Rockhampton Region
Localities in Queensland